The Coniston Group is a Silurian lithostratigraphic group (a sequence of rock strata) in the southern Lake District and north-west Pennines of northern England. The name is derived from the small town of Coniston in Cumbria. The rocks of the Group have also previously been referred to as the Coniston Grits or Coniston Grits Formation and Coniston Subgroup. The group comprises sandstones and siltstones and some laminated hemipelagites which achieve a thickness of between 1400 and 1900m. Overlain by the Bannisdale Formation of the Kendal Group and underlain by the Wray Castle Formation of the Tranearth Group, it is divided into several formations. These are, in ascending order (oldest first): Wray Castle, Gawthwaite, Latrigg, Poolscar, Moorhow (or Moorhowe) and Yewbank.

References

 

Silurian System of Europe
Geology of England
Geological groups of the United Kingdom
Geologic formations of the United Kingdom